The Swan River First Nation is a First Nations band government in northern Alberta. Located near Kinuso, it controls two Indian reserves, Swan River 150E and Assineau River 150F.

References

First Nations governments in Alberta
Cree governments